Rhizagrotis is a genus of moths of the family Noctuidae. The genus was erected by John Bernhardt Smith in 1890.

Species
 Rhizagrotis aegyptica (Joannis, 1910)
 Rhizagrotis albalis (Grote, 1878)
 Rhizagrotis cloanthoides (Grote, 1881)
 Rhizagrotis modesta (Barnes & McDunnough, 1911)
 Rhizagrotis stylata (J. B. Smith, 1893)

References

Noctuinae